Tomer may refer to:

 Tomer, a settlement in the West Bank
 Tomer (name), a Hebrew male given name